The 1978–79 St. Louis Blues season was the 12th for the franchise in St. Louis, Missouri.  The Blues finished the season with a record of just 18 wins (a franchise low), 50 losses and just 12 ties, for an all-time franchise low of 48 points.  The Blues finished out of the playoffs for the second straight season, and the last time before the 2005–06 season, following the lockout.

Offseason

Regular season

Final standings

Schedule and results

Playoffs
The Blues failed to qualify for the playoffs for the second straight year.

Player statistics

Regular season
Scoring

Goaltending

Awards and records

Transactions

Draft picks
St. Louis's draft picks at the 1978 NHL Amateur Draft held at the Queen Elizabeth Hotel in Montreal, Quebec.

Farm teams

See also
1978–79 NHL season

References

External links

St. Louis Blues seasons
St. Louis
St. Louis
St Louis
St Louis